Hedy García (born 8 February 1950) is a Filipino former swimmer. She competed in four events at the 1968 Summer Olympics.

References

1950 births
Living people
Filipino female swimmers
Olympic swimmers of the Philippines
Swimmers at the 1968 Summer Olympics
Asian Games medalists in swimming
Asian Games silver medalists for the Philippines
Asian Games bronze medalists for the Philippines
Swimmers at the 1966 Asian Games
Swimmers at the 1970 Asian Games
Medalists at the 1966 Asian Games
Medalists at the 1970 Asian Games